Corpozulia is a Venezuelan government organization that works in the area of economic development in Zulia State. Its mission is make Zulia one of the economically strongest states of Venezuela. It also contributes to cultural development.

External links
Corpozulia Website—

Zulia
Government-owned companies of Venezuela
Organizations established in 1969
1969 establishments in Venezuela